Newtonhill is a commuter town in Kincardineshire, Scotland. It is popular due to its location, just six miles south of Aberdeen with easy reach of Stonehaven and with views over the North Sea.

History
The town was originally called Skateraw. Skateraw was a fishing village, and the older part of the village(Still called Skateraw) between the railway line and the sea reflects that heritage though nearly all of the old houses have been modernised and extended. An old smoke house is still visible in Skateraw Road, though it is many years since it was in use.
The village had a railway station which led to the change of name from Skateraw to Newtonhill but it was closed in 1956; the signal box was still in use until May 2019 and remnants of a platform can still be seen. A feasibility study received funding in May 2018 to study the possible reopening of the station.

Newtonhill is in Kincardineshire, though local government re-organisation means that the local authority is Aberdeenshire Council.

The town is situated about half a mile east of the ancient Causey Mounth road, which was built on high ground to make passable this only available medieval route from coastal points north to Aberdeen. This ancient passage specifically connected the Bridge of Dee via Portlethen Moss, Muchalls Castle and Stonehaven to the south. The route was that taken by William Keith, 7th Earl Marischal and the Duke of Montrose when they led a Covenanter army of 9000 men in the first battle of the First Bishop's War in 1639.

Transport links
Newtonhill today is accessed by the A92 road and functions primarily as a commuter town to Aberdeen and other business hubs in the area. The town is also well served by buses run by Stagecoach Group providing regular services to Aberdeen, Stonehaven and Montrose. There are proposals to reopen Newtonhill railway station, on the main line to Aberdeen, which closed in 1956.

On 14 December 2015 the "park and choose" was opened to the west of the A92. It is served by the X7 Coastrider service. The facility, which also serves the nearby village of Chapelton, allowed two bus stops at the side of the A92 to be removed.

Community and amenities
Newtonhill has a successful Boys' Brigade chess team which has won the Scottish tournament many times and have won the British grand finals the most out of all British teams.
There is an active community spirit in Newtonhill and many events are organised through the   Newtonhill and District Village Association, with wider planning issues being discussed by the Community Council.

There are three commercial outlets; A Tesco Metro Store, a coffee shop - Skateraw Store and a pharmacy, which also hosts a weekly post office. There are two pubs in the town, Quoiters and The Newton Arms.

A community hall was built in the 1980s. Due to a demand for more space, it was expanded and renamed  the Bettridge Centre in 2003. The Centre is run by elected local residents. Beside this centre is Newtonhill Library. There is also the Skateraw Hall, originally provided for the residents when Newtonhill was a fishing village.

Newtonhill Primary School serves the town and surrounding hamlets of Muchalls and Cammachmore. It opened in April 1969 and had an initial roll of 144 pupils. It replaced Cairnhill and Cookney schools.

Geography

Newtonhill is located on the North-East coast of Scotland, approximately 9 miles south of Aberdeen and 6 miles north of Stonehaven.

The Burn of Elsick, which drains agricultural lands from the west, flows into the North Sea at Newtonhill.
The White Wife is a rock formation which allows sea angling. Newtonhill also has a great scenic views of the cliffs looking on to the pebble shore, where fishing still a custom to many.

See also
Cammachmore
Elsick House
May Craig
Chapelton, Aberdeenshire

References

Towns in Aberdeenshire